Rachel Lilian Alfreda de Silva (née Perera; 1920 - 2001) was a Sri Lankan poet, journalist and television screenwriter.

Biography 
De Silva studied at St John's College and Girton School, both at Nugegoda, and qualified as a teacher. She later received a Ford Foundation grant to spend a year at the Yale Experimental Theatre and Drama School.

Selected works 

 De Silva, A. (1973). Children's poems. Colombo: Hansa Pub.
De Silva, A. (1977). Out of the dark the sun. Place of publication not identified: publisher not identified.
De Silva, A. (1990). Pagoda House: Recollections of childhood. Colombo: Alfreda de Silva.

References 

1920 births
2001 deaths
Sri Lankan poets
Sri Lankan women poets
People from British Ceylon